The women's 4 × 100 metre medley relay competition of the swimming events at the 1987 Pan American Games took place on 14 August at the Indiana University Natatorium. The last Pan American Games champion was the United States.

Results
All times are in minutes and seconds.

Heats

Final 
The final was held on August 14.

References

Swimming at the 1987 Pan American Games
Pan